Molln  is a municipality in the district of Kirchdorf an der Krems in the Austrian state of Upper Austria. It is remembered as a place where there was a poacher battle in 1919 and four people were shot and killed.

Geography
Molln lies in the Traunviertel. About 70 percent of the municipality is forest, and 20 percent is farmland.

References

Cities and towns in Kirchdorf an der Krems District